The Jefferson Avenue  station is a Staten Island Railway station between the neighborhoods of Grant City and Dongan Hills, in Staten Island, New York.

Station layout
The station opened in 1937. Prior to 1965, the Jefferson Avenue crossing was at grade level. It only had a single warning bell for approaching trains. In the mid-1960s construction began on eliminating the crossings from Jefferson Avenue to New Dorp. The track was displaced onto South Railroad Avenue and the station as well as the crossing were temporarily relocated to Adams Avenue. Jefferson Avenue and the adjacent intersections were dropped below grade and the current station was built.

Currently, the station is located on an embankment at Jefferson Avenue and Railroad Avenue on the main line. This station has two side platforms.  From north to south, Jefferson Avenue station begins the descent from the embankment to the open cut.

This is the only station on the Staten Island Railway that is named for the street it serves rather than the neighborhood.

Exit
The only exit is at the northeast end, which leads to Jefferson Avenue. There is no station house.

References

External links

Staten Island Railway station list
Staten Island Railway general information
 Two Long Island Rail Road EMU's at Jefferson Avenue Station; August 21,1972 (TrainsAreFun)
 Jefferson Avenue entrance from Google Maps Street View
Platforms from Google Maps Street View

Staten Island Railway stations
Railway stations in the United States opened in 1937